August Ludwig Traugott Botho Graf zu Eulenburg (22 October 1838 – 16 June 1921) was an officer in the Prussian, and later German armies, and official in the Prussian royal court. He was the younger brother of Count Botho zu Eulenburg, who served as Minister-President of Prussia from 1892 to 1894, and a second cousin of Philipp, Prince of Eulenburg, the close friend of Kaiser Wilhelm II.

Biography
Born into the Upper Saxon noble family of Eulenburg, August joined the army on 1 November 1856 as a grenadier in the 1st Foot Guard Regiment after his graduation from the Marienwerder Gymnasium. He was promoted to second lieutenant two years later on 13 April 1858, and between 1860 to 1862 he participated in the trade mission in East Asia as an attaché under his kinsman Friedrich Albrecht zu Eulenburg.

Upon his return to Prussia in 1865, Eulenburg pursued a career in the royal court; he was made a personal adjutant to the crown prince (the future Emperor Frederick III), before being appointed Marshal of the Royal Court in 1868, thus placing him in charge of the court's administrative affairs. He then served as a member of the General-Ordenskommission from 1879 to 1890, and served as Chief Master of Ceremonies between 1883 to 1914 and Grand Marshal of the Court and House (Oberhof- und Hausmarschall) to Kaiser Wilhelm II from 1890 to 1914. He was also a member of the Herrenhaus and Minister of the Royal House from 1907 to the end of Wilhelm II's reign in 1918.

Following Otto von Bismarck's dismissal in 1890, Eulenburg mediated the reconciliation between the emperor and former chancellor. Conversely, he encouraged the rift between his brother Botho and Caprivi, in the hopes that the former would replace the latter as chancellor, as Botho was seen in conservative circles as a bulwark against the rising threat of social democracy; Wilhelm II would ultimately appoint Prince Hohenlohe.

Eulenburg retired from active military service as a colonel in 1889, but was promoted to major-general in 1891 and lieutenant-general in 1895, before being made à la suite General of the Infantry on 18 October 1904. He continued to serve as Chief Representative (General-Bevollmächtigter) of the House of Hohenzollern after the November Revolution for the remainder of his life.

He died in 1921 in Berlin, and was buried in the Holy Trinity Cemetery in the Kreuzberg district alongside his family.

Honours
German orders and decorations

Foreign orders and decorations

Notes

References

Literature
 
 

1838 births
1921 deaths
People from the Province of Prussia
Military personnel from Königsberg
Counts of Germany
Generals of Infantry (Prussia)
Members of the Prussian House of Lords
Recipients of the Iron Cross (1870), 2nd class
Recipients of the Military Merit Order (Bavaria)
Grand Crosses of the Order of Saint Stephen of Hungary
Grand Crosses of the Order of the Dannebrog
Knights Grand Cross of the Order of Saints Maurice and Lazarus
Recipients of the Order of the Crown (Italy)
Knights Grand Cross of the Order of Pope Pius IX
Knights of the Order of Saint Joseph
Grand Cordons of the Order of the Rising Sun
Grand Crosses of the Order of Saint-Charles
Recipients of the Order of the Netherlands Lion
Recipients of the Order of the Medjidie, 1st class
Knights Grand Cross of the Order of the Immaculate Conception of Vila Viçosa
Grand Crosses of the Order of Aviz
Grand Crosses of the Order of the Star of Romania
Recipients of the Order of St. Vladimir, 2nd class
Recipients of the Order of St. Anna, 1st class
Recipients of the Order of the Cross of Takovo
Commanders Grand Cross of the Order of the Polar Star
Grand Crosses of the Order of Vasa
Annulled Honorary Knights Grand Cross of the Royal Victorian Order